The 2003 FIVB Volleyball Men's U21 World Championship was the 12th edition of the FIVB Volleyball Men's U21 World Championship. It was held in Tehran, Iran from August 23 to 31, 2003.

Qualification

First round
All times are Iran Daylight Time (UTC+04:30)

Pool A

|}

|}

Pool B

|}

|}

Pool C

|}

|}

Pool D

|}

|}

Second round

Play off - elimination group

|}

Play off - seeding group

|}

Final round
All times are Iran Daylight Time (UTC+04:30)

5th–8th semifinals

|}

7th place

|}

5th place

|}

Quarterfinals

|}

Semifinals

|}

3rd place

|}

Final

|}

Final standing

References

External links
 2003 FIVB 12th MEN’S U21 World Championship fivb.org

FIVB Volleyball Men's U21 World Championship
2003 in volleyball
2003 in Iranian sport
International volleyball competitions hosted by Iran
2003 in youth sport